The 2009 Atlanta Braves season was the 44th season in Atlanta and the 139th overall. The Braves were once again skippered by Bobby Cox, then in his 24th season managing the team. It was the Braves' 44th season in Atlanta, and the 138th season overall for the franchise.

Preseason transactions

Notable free agent acquisitions

Notable Players lost to free agency

Source: Baseball-Reference.com 2009 Atlanta Braves Trades and Transactions

Pre-season trades

Regular season

Season standings

Record vs. opponents

Game log

|- style="background:#bbffbb"
| 1 || April 5 || @ Phillies || 4–1 || Lowe (1–0) || Myers (0–1) || || 2:22 || 44,532|| 1–0
|- style="background:#bbffbb"
| 2 || April 7 || @ Phillies || 4–0 || Jurrjens (1–0) || Moyer (0–1) || || 2:36 || 44,178|| 2–0
|- style="background:#ffbbbb"
| 3 || April 8 || @ Phillies || 11–12 || Condrey (1–0) || Boyer (0–1) || Lidge (1) || 3:13 || 44,939|| 2–1
|- style="background:#bbffbb"
| 4 || April 10 || Nationals || 6–5 || Campillo (1–0) || Beimel (0–1) || || 3:58 || 48,327|| 3–1
|- style="background:#bbffbb"
| 5 || April 11 || Nationals || 5–3 || Kawakami (1–0) || Lannan (0–2) || González (1) || 2:33 || 34,325|| 4–1
|- style="background:#bbffbb"
| 6 || April 12 || Nationals || 8–5 || Jurrjens (2–0) || Olsen (0–2) || Soriano (1) || 2:47 || 19,873|| 5–1
|- style="background:#ffbbbb"
| 7 || April 14 || Marlins || 1–5 || Volstad (2–0) || Vázquez (0–1) || || 2:31 || 16,293|| 5–2
|- style="background:#ffbbbb"
| 8 || April 15 || Marlins || 4–10 || Penn (1–0) || Moylan (0–1) || || 3:07 || 19,204|| 5–3
|- style="background:#ffbbbb"
| 9 || April 16 || Marlins || 2–6 || Sánchez (1–0) || Kawakami (1–1) || || 2:49 || 21,072|| 5–4
|- style="background:#ffbbbb"
| 10 || April 17 || @ Pirates || 0–3 || Maholm (2–0) || Jurrjens (2–1) || Capps (3) || 2:36 || 15,659|| 5–5
|- style="background:#ffbbbb"
| 11 || April 18 || @ Pirates || 0–10 || Snell (1–2) || Reyes (0–1) || || 2:22 || 20,755|| 5–6
|- style="background:#bbffbb"
| 12 || April 19 || @ Pirates || 11–1 || Vázquez (1–1) || Duke (2–1) || || 2:48 || 14,776|| 6–6
|- style="background:#ffbbbb"
| 13 || April 20 || @ Nationals || 2–3 || Zimmermann (1–0) || Lowe (1–1) || Hanrahan (1) || 2:24 || 12,473|| 6–7
|- style="background:#ffbbbb"
| 14 || April 21 || @ Nationals || 3–4 || Martis (2–0) || Kawakami (1–2) || Hanrahan (2) || 2:47 || 15,439|| 6–8
|- style="background:#bbffbb"
| 15 || April 22 || @ Nationals || 1–0 || González (1–0) || Mock (0–1) || Soriano (2) || 2:30 || 15,567|| 7–8
|- style="background:#bbffbb"
| 16 || April 24 || @ Reds || 4–3 || Vázquez (2–1) || Vólquez (2–2) || González (2) || 3:30 || 30,060|| 8–8
|- style="background:#bbffbb"
| 17 || April 25 || @ Reds || 10–2 || Lowe (2–1) || Arroyo (3–1) || || 2:38 || 33,015|| 9–8
|- style="background:#ffbbbb"
| 18 || April 26 || @ Reds || 2–8 || Owings (1–2) || Kawakami (1–3) || || 2:36 || 29,327|| 9–9
|- style="background:#ffbbbb"
| 19 || April 27 || Cardinals || 2–3 || Piñeiro (4–0) || Jurrjens (2–2) || Franklin (6) || 2:46 || 16,739|| 9–10
|- style="background:#bbffbb"
| 20 || April 28 || Cardinals || 2–1 || Moylan (1–1) || McClellan (1–1) || González (3) || 2:23 || 18,121|| 10–10
|- style="background:#ffbbbb"
| 21 || April 29 || Cardinals || 3–5 || Wainwright (3–0) || Vázquez (2–2) || Franklin (7) || 2:49 || 19,127|| 10–11

|- style="background:#bbffbb"
| 22 || May 1 || Astros || 7–2 || Lowe (3–1) || Hampton (1–2) || || 2:47 || 29,309|| 11–11
|- style="background:#ffbbbb"
| 23 || May 2 || Astros || 1–5 || Byrdak (1–0) || Carlyle (0–1) || || 2:48 || 28,203|| 11–12
|- style="background:#ffbbbb"
| 24 || May 3 || Astros || 5–7 || Geary (1–3) || Moylan (1–2) || Hawkins (3) || 3:18 || 27,921|| 11–13
|- style="background:#ffbbbb"
| 25 || May 4 || Mets || 4–6 || Maine (2–2) || Vázquez (2–3) || Rodríguez (6) || 2:42 || 19,132|| 11–14
|- style="background:#ffbbbb"
| 26 || May 5 || Mets || 3–4 || Hernández (2–1) || Kawakami (1–4) || Rodríguez (7) || 3:13 || 21,049|| 11–15
|- style="background:#bbffbb"
| 27 || May 6 || @ Marlins || 8–6 || Lowe (4–1) || Taylor (0–2) || González (4) || 3:09 || 12,725|| 12–15
|- style="background:#bbffbb"
| 28 || May 7 || @ Marlins || 4–2 || Jurrjens (3–2) || Sánchez (1–4) || González (5) || 2:46 || 17,759|| 13–15
|- style="background:#ffbbbb"
| 29 || May 8 || @ Phillies || 6–10 || Hamels (1–2) || Reyes (0–2) || || 2:29 || 45,312|| 13–16
|- style="background:#bbffbb"
| 30 || May 9 || @ Phillies || 6–2 || Vázquez (3–3) || Blanton (1–3) || || 2:29 || 45,339|| 14–16
|- style="background:#bbffbb"
| 31 || May 10 || @ Phillies || 4–2 || Kawakami (2–4) || Taschner (1–1) || Soriano (3) || 2:50 || 45,343|| 15–16
|- style="background:#bbffbb"
| 32 || May 11 || @ Mets || 8–3 || Lowe (5–1) || Santana (4–2) || || 3:04 || 40,497|| 16–16
|- style="background:#ffbbbb"
| 33 || May 12 || @ Mets || 3–4 || Rodríguez (1–0) || Bennett (0–1) || || 3:02 || 39,408|| 16–17
|- style="background:#bbffbb"
| 34 || May 13 || @ Mets || 8–7 || Bennett (1–1) || Takahashi (0–1) || González (6) || 3:46 || 40,555|| 17–17
|- style="background:#bbffbb"
| 35 || May 15 || Diamondbacks || 4–3 || González (2–0) || Peña (3–1) || || 2:50 || 32,593|| 18–17
|- style="background:#ffbbbb"
| 36 || May 16 || Diamondbacks || 0–12 || Scherzer (1–3) || Kawakami (2–5) || || 3:10 || 30,162|| 18–18
|- style="background:#bbbbbb"
| – || May 17 || Diamondbacks || colspan='6' |Rescheduled for August 17 || 18–18
|- style="background:#ffbbbb"
| 38 || May 18 || Rockies || 1–5 || Marquis (5–3) || Lowe (5–2) || || 2:30 || 15,364|| 18–19
|- style="background:#bbffbb"
| 39 || May 19 || Rockies || 8–1 || Jurrjens (4–2) || Hammel (0–3) || || 2:46 || 16,749|| 19–19
|- style="background:#bbffbb"
| 40 || May 20 || Rockies || 12–4 || Vázquez (4–3) || de la Rosa (0–4) || || 3:17 || 19,259|| 20–19
|- style="background:#ffbbbb"
| 41 || May 21 || Rockies || 0–9 || Cook (3–1) || Medlen (0–1) || || 2:35 || 25,481|| 20–20
|- style="background:#bbffbb"
| 42 || May 22 || Blue Jays || 1–0 || Kawakami (3–5) || Carlson (1–3) || González (7) || 2:19 || 21,533|| 21–20
|- style="background:#bbffbb"
| 43 || May 23 || Blue Jays || 4–3 || Lowe (6–2) || Janssen (0–1) || Soriano (4) || 2:31 || 27,377|| 22–20
|- style="background:#bbffbb"
| 44 || May 24 || Blue Jays || 10–2 || Bennett (2–1) || Camp (0–2) || || 2:59 || 23,971|| 23–20
|- style="background:#ffbbbb"
| 45 || May 25 || @ Giants || 2–8 || Sánchez (2–4) || Vázquez (4–4) || || 3:04 || 40,034|| 23–21
|- style="background:#ffbbbb"
| 46 || May 26 || @ Giants || 0–4 || Lincecum (4–1) || Medlen (0–2) || || 2:08 || 29,485|| 23–22
|- style="background:#ffbbbb"
| 47 || May 27 || @ Giants || 3–6 || Johnson (4–4) || Kawakami (3–6) || Wilson (10) || 2:59 || 27,744|| 23–23
|- style="background:#ffbbbb"
| 48 || May 28 || @ Diamondbacks || 2–5 || Haren (4–4) || Lowe (6–3) || Qualls (12) || 2:20 || 19,452|| 23–24
|- style="background:#bbffbb"
| 49 || May 29 || @ Diamondbacks || 10–6 || Jurrjens (5–2) || Garland (4–4) || || 3:10 || 26,146|| 24–24
|- style="background:#ffbbbb"
| 50 || May 30 || @ Diamondbacks || 2–3 || Peña (5–2) || Bennett (2–2) || || 3:06 || 35,039|| 24–25
|- style="background:#bbffbb"
| 51 || May 31 || @ Diamondbacks || 9–3 || Medlen (1–2) || Scherzer (2–4) || || 2:56 || 30,020|| 25–25

|- style="background:#bbffbb"
| 52 || June 2 || Cubs || 6–5 || Soriano (1–0) || Heilman (2–3) || || 3:39 || 30,262|| 26–25
|- style="background:#ffbbbb"
| 53 || June 3 || Cubs || 2–3 || Guzmán (2–0) || Bennett (2–3) || Gregg (9) || 3:19 || 30,646|| 26–26
|- style="background:#bbbbbb"
| – || June 4 || Cubs || colspan='6' |Rescheduled for June 22 || 26–26
|- style="background:#ffbbbb"
| 55 || June 5 || Brewers || 0–4 || Gallardo (6–2) || Jurrjens (5–3) || || 2:23 || 23,327|| 26–27
|- style="background:#ffbbbb"
| 56 || June 6 || Brewers || 0–3 || Suppan (4–4) || Vázquez (4–5) || Hoffman (15) || 2:57 || 32,721|| 26–28
|- style="background:#bbffbb"
| 57 || June 7 || Brewers || 8–7 || O'Flaherty (1–0) || Villanueva (2–4) || González (8) || 2:49 || 33,428|| 27–28
|- style="background:#bbffbb"
| 58 || June 8 || Pirates || 7–6 || Medlen (2–2) || Karstens (2–4) || || 4:46 || 21,856|| 28–28
|- style="background:#bbffbb"
| 59 || June 9 || Pirates || 4–3 || Lowe (7–3) || Burnett (1–2) || Soriano (5) || 2:35 || 20,124|| 29–28
|- style="background:#ffbbbb"
| 60 || June 10 || Pirates || 2–3 || Karstens (3–4) || Jurrjens (5–4) || Capps (14) || 2:42 || 21,610|| 29–29
|- style="background:#ffbbbb"
| 61 || June 11 || Pirates || 1–3 || Jackson (2–1) || Soriano (1–1) || Capps (15) || 2:37 || 29,331|| 29–30
|- style="background:#bbffbb"
| 62 || June 12 || @ Orioles || 7–2 || Hanson (1–0) || Berken (1–3) || || 3:15 || 28,469|| 30–30
|- style="background:#ffbbbb"
| 63 || June 13 || @ Orioles || 4–8 || Bass (4–1) || O'Flaherty (1–1) || || 3:07 || 29,645|| 30–31
|- style="background:#ffbbbb"
| 64 || June 14 || @ Orioles || 2–11 || Bergesen (4–2) || Lowe (7–4) || || 2:42 || 26,770|| 30–32
|- style="background:#ffbbbb"
| 65 || June 16 || @ Reds || 2–7 || Herrera (1–2) || Jurrjens (5–5) || || 2:53 || 19,127|| 30–33
|- style="background:#ffbbbb"
| 66 || June 17 || @ Reds || 3–4 || Owings (4–7) || Vázquez (4–6) || Cordero (16) || 2:44 || 27,455|| 30–34
|- style="background:#bbffbb"
| 67 || June 18 || @ Reds || 7–0 || Hanson (2–0) || Maloney (0–2)|| || 3:15 || 24,657|| 31–34
|- style="background:#bbffbb"
| 68 || June 19 || @ Red Sox || 8–2 || Kawakami (4–6) || Matsuzaka (1–5) || || 2:49 || 37,703|| 32–34
|- style="background:#ffbbbb"
| 69 || June 20 || @ Red Sox || 0–3 || Beckett (8–3) || Lowe (7–5) || || 2:11 || 38,029|| 32–35
|- style="background:#ffbbbb"
| 70 || June 21 || @ Red Sox || 5–6 || Papelbon (1–1) || Bennett (2–4) || || 2:47 || 37,243|| 32–36
|- style="background:#bbffbb"
| 54 || June 22 || Cubs || 2–0 || Vázquez (5–6) || Dempster (4–5) || Soriano (6) || 2:58 || 31,701|| 33–36
|- style="background:#bbffbb"
| 71 || June 23 || Yankees || 4–0 || Hanson (3–0) || Wang (0–6) || || 2:47 || 40,828|| 34–36
|- style="background:#ffbbbb"
| 72 || June 24 || Yankees || 4–8 || Chamberlain (4–2) || Medlen (2–3) || Rivera (16)|| 3:16 || 42,315|| 34–37
|- style="background:#ffbbbb"
| 73 || June 25 || Yankees || 7–11 || Aceves (5–1) || Lowe (7–6) || Rivera (17) || 3:49 || 47,508|| 34–38
|- style="background:#ffbbbb"
| 74 || June 26 || Red Sox || 1–4 || Beckett (9–3) || Jurrjens (5–6) || || 2:46 || 48,418|| 34–39
|- style="background:#ffbbbb"
| 75 || June 27 || Red Sox || 0–1 || Wakefield (10–3) || Vázquez (5–7) || Papelbon (18) || 2:46 || 48,151|| 34–40
|- style="background:#bbffbb"
| 76 || June 28 || Red Sox || 2–1 || Hanson (4–0) || Penny (6–3) || Gonzalez (9) || 3:01 || 41,463|| 35–40
|- style="background:#bbffbb"
| 77 || June 30 || Phillies || 5–4 || Moylan (2–2) || Park (3–2) || || 3:14 || 31,818|| 36–40

|- style="background:#bbffbb"
| 78 || July 1 || Phillies || 11–1 || Jurrjens (6–6) || Hamels (4–5) || || 2:32 || 25,212|| 37–40
|- style="background:#bbffbb"
| 79 || July 2 || Phillies || 5–2 || Gonzalez (3–0) || Madson (2–4) || Soriano (7) || 3:08 || 38,254|| 38–40
|- style="background:#bbffbb"
| 80 || July 3 || @ Nationals || 9–8 || Logan (1–0) || Colomé (1–1) || Soriano (8) || 3:28 || 33,982|| 39–40
|- style="background:#ffbbbb"
| 81 || July 4 || @ Nationals || 3–5 || Lannan (6–5) || Gonzalez (3–1) || MacDougal (4) || 2:34 || 23,708|| 39–41
|- style="background:#ffbbbb"
| 82 || July 5 || @ Nationals || 3–5 || Olsen (2–4) || Lowe (7–7) || MacDougal (5)|| 2:39 || 22,677|| 39–42
|- style="background:#ffbbbb"
| 83 || July 6 || @ Cubs || 2–4 || Wells (4–3) || Jurrjens (6–7) || Gregg (15) || 2:30 || 40,042|| 39–43
|- style="background:#bbffbb"
| 84 || July 7 || @ Cubs || 2–1 || Vázquez (6–7) || Zambrano (4–4) || Soriano (9) || 2:44 || 40,359|| 40–43
|- style="background:#bbffbb"
| 85 || July 8 || @ Cubs || 4–1 || Kawakami (5–6) || Hart (0–1) || Soriano (10) || 2:50 || 40,531|| 41–43
|- style="background:#ffbbbb"
| 86 || July 9 || @ Rockies || 6–7 || Rincón (2–0) || Gonzalez (3–2) || Street (22) || 3:11 || 30,392|| 41–44
|- style="background:#bbffbb"
| 87 || July 10 || @ Rockies || 4–1 || Lowe (8–7) || Jiménez (6–9) || Soriano (11) || 2:40 || 35,238|| 42–44
|- style="background:#bbffbb"
| 88 || July 11 || @ Rockies || 4–3 || Jurrjens (7–7) || Marquis (11–6) || Soriano (12) || 2:51 || 38,065|| 43–44
|- style="background:#ffbbbb"
| 89 || July 12 || @ Rockies || 7–8 || Street (3–1)|| Valdez (0–1) || || 3:15 || 33,825|| 43–45
|- style="text-align:center;" style="background:##f0e68c"
| – || July 14 || colspan='9'|2009 Major League Baseball All-Star Game in St. Louis, Missouri
|- style="background:#bbffbb"
| 90 || July 16 || Mets || 5–3 || Acosta (1–0) || Feliciano (2–3) || Soriano (13) || 2:57 || 32,736|| 44–45
|- style="background:#bbffbb"
| 91 || July 17 || Mets || 11–0 || Jurrjens (8–7) || Pelfrey (7–5) || || 2:38 || 50,704|| 45–45
|- style="background:#ffbbbb"
| 92 || July 18 || Mets || 1–5 || Santana (11–7) || Kawakami (5–7) || || 3:22 || 51,175|| 45–46
|- style="background:#bbffbb"
| 93 || July 19 || Mets || 7–1 || Vázquez (7–7) || Redding (1–4) || || 2:47 || 34,293|| 46–46
|- style="background:#bbffbb"
| 94 || July 20 || Giants || 11–3 || Hanson (5–0) || Romo (2–1) || || 2:50 || 21,988|| 47–46
|- style="background:#bbffbb"
| 95 || July 21 || Giants || 8–1 || Lowe (9–7) || Sadowski (2–2) || || 2:41 || 25,135|| 48–46
|- style="background:#bbffbb"
| 96 || July 22 || Giants || 4–2 || Jurrjens (9–7) || Lincecum (10–3) || Soriano (14) || 2:28 || 34,672|| 49–46
|- style="background:#ffbbbb"
| 97 || July 23 || Giants || 1–5 || Zito (6–10) || Gonzalez (3–3) || || 2:58 || 31,727|| 49–47
|- style="background:#bbffbb"
| 98 || July 24 || @ Brewers || 9–4 || Vázquez (8–7) || Villanueva (2–7) || || 3:25 || 41,941|| 50–47
|- style="background:#ffbbbb"
| 99 || July 25 || @ Brewers || 0–4 || Gollardo (9–7) || Hanson (5–1) || || 2:56 || 43,565|| 50–48
|- style="background:#bbffbb"
| 100 || July 26 || @ Brewers || 10–2 || Lowe (10–7) || Looper (9–5) || || 2:47 || 43,471|| 51–48
|- style="background:#ffbbbb"
| 101 || July 28 || @ Marlins || 3–4 || Núñez (3–3) || Soriano (1–2) || || 2:48 || 13,128|| 51–49
|- style="background:#ffbbbb"
| 102 || July 29 || @ Marlins || 3–6 || Johnson (10–2) || Kawakami (5–8) || Núñez (8) || 2:48 || 13,518|| 51–50
|- style="background:#bbffbb"
| 103 || July 30 || @ Marlins || 6–3 || Moylan (3–2) || Ayala (1–3) || Soriano (15) || 3:16 || 14,226|| 52–50
|- style="background:#ffbbbb"
| 104 || July 31 || Dodgers || 0–5 || Schmidt (2–1) || Hanson (5–2) || || 2:53 || 45,225|| 52–51

|- style="background:#bbffbb"
| 105 || August 1 || Dodgers || 4–3 || Lowe (11–7) || Wolf (5–6) || Soriano (16) || 2:41 || 49,843|| 53–51
|- style="background:#ffbbbb"
| 106 || August 2 || Dodgers || 1–9 || Billingsley (11–6) || Jurrjens (9–8) || || 3:22 || 37,654|| 53–52
|- style="background:#ffbbbb"
| 107 || August 3 || @ Padres || 2–4 || Latos (3–1) || Kawakami (5–9) || Bell (27) || 2:33 || 20,423|| 53–53
|- style="background:#bbffbb"
| 108 || August 4 || @ Padres || 9–2 || Vázquez (9–7) || Stauffer (1–3) || || 2:52 || 17,916|| 54–53
|- style="background:#bbffbb"
| 109 || August 5 || @ Padres || 6–2 || Hanson (6–2) || Gaudin (4–10) || || 2:52 || 21,816|| 55–53
|- style="background:#ffbbbb"
| 110 || August 6 || @ Dodgers || 4–5 || Elbert (2–0) || Soriano (1–3) || || 3:13 || 46,399|| 55–54
|- style="background:#bbffbb"
| 111 || August 7 || @ Dodgers || 9–5 || Moylan (4–2) || Troncoso (4–1) || || 4:20 || 53,184|| 56–54
|- style="background:#bbffbb"
| 112 || August 8 || @ Dodgers || 2–1 || Medlen (3–3) || Mota (3–3) || Soriano (17) || 3:31 || 53,338|| 57–54
|- style="background:#bbffbb"
| 113 || August 9 || @ Dodgers || 8–2 || Vázquez (10–7) || Stults (4–3) || || 2:53 || 45,438|| 58–54
|- style="background:#bbffbb"
| 114 || August 11 || Nationals || 8–1 || Hanson (7–2) || Lannan (8–9) || || 3:01 || 19,273|| 59–54
|- style="background:#bbffbb"
| 115 || August 12 || Nationals || 6–2 || Lowe (12–7) || Sosa (1–1) || || 2:34 || 17,886|| 60–54
|- style="background:#ffbbbb"
| 116 || August 14 || Phillies || 2–3 || Madson (4–4) || Soriano (1–4) || Lidge (22) || 2:21 || 37,639|| 60–55
|- style="background:#bbffbb"
| 117 || August 15 || Phillies || 4–3 || Moylan (5–2) || Lidge (0–5) || || 2:54 || 44,043|| 61–55
|- style="background:#ffbbbb"
| 118 || August 16 || Phillies || 1–4 || Happ (9–2) || Vázquez (10–8) || Lidge (23) || 2:45 || 25,215|| 61–56
|- style="background:#bbffbb"
| 37 || August 17 || Diamondbacks || 9–4 || Hanson (8–2) || Scherzer (7–7) || || 2:45 || 23,668|| 62–56
|- style="background:#ffbbbb"
| 119 || August 18 || @ Mets || 4–9 || Pérez (3–3) || Lowe (12–8) || || 2:52 || 38,613|| 62–57
|- style="background:#bbffbb"
| 120 || August 19 || @ Mets || 14–2 || Jurrjens (10–8) || Parnell (3–5) || || 2:54 || 38,602|| 63–57
|- style="background:#bbffbb"
| 121 || August 20 || @ Mets || 3–2 || Kawakami (6–9) || Santana (13–9) || Soriano (18) || 2:41 || 39,105|| 64–57
|- style="background:#ffbbbb"
| 122 || August 21 || Marlins || 3–5 || Sánchez (2–4) || Vázquez (10–9) || Núñez (14) || 2:48 || 22,608|| 64–58
|- style="background:#bbffbb"
| 123 || August 22 || Marlins || 4–3 || Hanson (9–2) || Volstad (9–10) || Soriano (19) || 2:47 || 35,200|| 65–58
|- style="background:#bbffbb"
| 124 || August 23 || Marlins || 7–5 || Moylan (6–2) || Calero (2–2) || Soriano (20) || 3:04 || 30,478|| 66–58
|- style="background:#ffbbbb"
| 125 || August 25 || Padres || 1–2 || Thatcher (1–0) || Medlen (3–4) || Mujica (2) || 3:43 || 15,389|| 66–59
|- style="background:#ffbbbb"
| 126 || August 26 || Padres || 5–12 || Stauffer (2–6) || Kawakami (6–10) || || 3:23 || 15,619|| 66–60
|- style="background:#bbffbb"
| 127 || August 27 || Padres || 9–1 || Vázquez (11–9) || Richard (7–4) || || 2:50 || 18,651|| 67–60
|- style="background:#ffbbbb"
| 128 || August 28 || @ Phillies || 2–4 || Moyer (12–9) || Hanson (9–3) || Lidge (26) || 2:24 || 44,747|| 67–61
|- style="background:#bbffbb"
| 129 || August 29 || @ Phillies || 9–1 || Lowe (13–8) || Lee (12–10) || || 2:46 || 45,134|| 68–61
|- style="background:#ffbbbb"
| 130 || August 30 || @ Phillies || 2–3 || Blanton (9–6) || Jurrjens (10–9) || Lidge (27) || 2:27 || 44,828|| 68–62
|- style="background:#bbffbb"
| 131 || August 31 || @ Marlins || 5–2 || Kawakami (7–10) || Johnson (13–4) || || 2:38 || 12,244|| 69–62

|- style="background:#bbffbb"
| 132 || September 1 || @ Marlins || 4–3 || Hudson (1–0) || Sánchez (2–6) || Soriano (21) || 3:02 || 14,024|| 70–62
|- style="background:#ffbbbb"
| 133 || September 2 || @ Marlins || 7–8 || Núñez (4–4) || Gonzalez (3–4) || || 3:40 || 14,723|| 70–63
|- style="background:#ffbbbb"
| 134 || September 3 || @ Marlins || 3–8 || Nolasco (10–8) || Medlen (3–5) || || 3:13 || 13,711|| 70–64
|- style="background:#ffbbbb"
| 135 || September 4 || Reds || 1–3 || Arroyo (12–12) || Lowe (13–9) || || 2:25 || 24,219|| 70–65
|- style="background:#ffbbbb"
| 136 || September 5 || Reds || 1–3 || Wells (1–3) || Jurrjens (10–10) || || 2:40 || 29,078|| 70–66
|- style="background:#ffbbbb"
| 137 || September 6 || Reds || 2–4 || Owings (7–12) || Kawakami (7–11) || || 3:39 || 32,397|| 70–67
|- style="background:#bbffbb"
| 138 || September 8 || @ Astros || 2–1 || Vázquez (12–9) || Paulino (2–8) || Soriano (22) || 2:33 || 26,081|| 71–67
|- style="background:#ffbbbb"
| 139 || September 9 || @ Astros || 1–2 || Valverde (4–2) || Soriano (1–5) || || 2:13 || 22,392|| 71–68
|- style="background:#bbffbb"
| 140 || September 10 || @ Astros || 9–7 || Lowe (14–9) || Oswalt (8–6) || Gonzalez (10) || 3:11 || 26,552|| 72–68
|- style="background:#bbffbb"
| 141 || September 11 || @ Cardinals || 1–0 || Jurrjens (11–10) || Piñeiro (14–10) || Soriano (23) || 2:34 || 43,984|| 73–68
|- style="background:#bbffbb"
| 142 || September 12 || @ Cardinals || 7–6 || Gonzalez (4–4) || Franklin (2–3) || Soriano (24) || 3:13 || 43,869|| 74–68
|- style="background:#bbffbb"
| 143 || September 13 || @ Cardinals || 9–2 || Vázquez (13–9) || Carpenter (16–4) || || 2:08 || 41,179|| 75–68
|- style="background:#bbffbb"
| 144 || September 15 || Mets || 6–0 || Hanson (10–3) || Misch (1–3) || || 2:27 || 25,094|| 76–68
|- style="background:#bbffbb"
| 145 || September 16 || Mets || 6–5 || O'Flaherty (2–1) || Rodríguez (3–5) || || 3:32 || 17,988|| 77–68
|- style="background:#bbffbb"
| 146 || September 17 || Mets || 7–3 || Jurrjens (12–10) || Figueroa (2–6) || || 2:22 || 20,192|| 78–68
|- style="background:#ffbbbb"
| 147 || September 18 || Phillies || 4–9 || Kendrick (2–1) || Hudson (1–1) || || 2:57 || 27,241|| 78–69
|- style="background:#bbffbb"
| 148 || September 19 || Phillies || 6–4 || Vázquez (14–9) || Martínez (5–1) || || 2:43 || 35,818|| 79–69
|- style="background:#ffbbbb"
| 149 || September 20 || Phillies || 2–4 || Walker (2–0) || Hanson (10–4) || Lidge (31) || 2:46 || 29,452|| 79–70
|- style="background:#bbffbb"
| 150 || September 21 || @ Mets || 11–3 || Lowe (15–9) || Misch (1–4) || Kawakami (1) || 2:32 || 37,706|| 80–70
|- style="background:#bbffbb"
| 151 || September 22 || @ Mets || 3–1 || Jurrjens (13–10) || Figueroa (2–7) || Soriano (25) || 2:46 || 37,823|| 81–70
|- style="background:#bbffbb"
| 152 || September 23 || @ Mets || 5–2 || Hudson (2–1)|| Pelfrey (10–12) || Soriano (26) || 3:18 || 38,266|| 82–70
|- style="background:#bbffbb"
| 153 || September 25 || @ Nationals || 4–1 || Vázquez (15–9)|| Lannan (9–13) || || 2:27 || 28,276|| 83–70
|- style="background:#bbffbb"
| 154 || September 26 || @ Nationals || 11–5 || Hanson (11–4) || Mock (3–10) || || 2:48 || 29,058|| 84–70
|- style="background:#bbffbb"
| 155 || September 27 || @ Nationals || 6–3 || Gonzalez (5–4) || MacDougal (1–1) || Soriano (27) || 2:55 || 27,840|| 85–70
|- style="background:#bbffbb"
| 156 || September 28 || Marlins || 4–0 || Jurrjens (14–10) || Sánchez (3–8) || || 2:37 || 25,046|| 86–70
|- style="background:#ffbbbb"
| 157 || September 29 || Marlins || 4–5 || Pinto (4–1) || Kawakami (7–12) || Núñez (25) || 3:20 || 28,669|| 86–71
|- style="background:#ffbbbb"
| 158 || September 30 || Marlins || 4–5 || Nolasco (13–9) || Vázquez (15–10) || Donnelly (2) || 3:00 || 31,513|| 86–72

|- style="background:#ffbbbb"
| 159 || October 1 || Nationals || 1–2 || Clippard (4–2) || Soriano (1–6) || MacDougal (19) || 2:47 || 38,237|| 86–73
|- style="background:#ffbbbb"
| 160 || October 2 || Nationals || 0–6 || Hernández (9–12) || Lowe (15–10) || MacDougal (20) || 2:56 || 33,124|| 86–74
|- style="background:#ffbbbb"
| 161 || October 3 || Nationals || 4–6 || Segovia (1–0) || Acosta (1–1) || Kensing (1) || 3:16 || 28,278|| 86–75
|- style="background:#ffbbbb"
| 162 || October 4 || Nationals || 1–2 || Kensing (1–2) || Logan (1–1) || || 4:18 || 36,307|| 86–76

|-
|

Roster

Mid-season trades

Player stats

Most games at position
Note: Pos = Position; GP = Games Played

As of October 4, 2009
Source: ESPN.com-Atlanta Braves Lineup-Games By Position
× = No longer with team
† = On DL

Batting
Note: G = Games played; AB = At bats; R = Runs scored; H = Hits; 2B = Doubles; 3B = Triples; HR = Home runs; RBI = Runs batted in; AVG = Batting average; SB = Stolen bases

As of October 4, 2009
* = Acquired Mid-Season
# = Not on Active roster
"()" = Stats with Braves

Pitching
Note: W = Wins; L = Losses; ERA = Earned run average; G = Games pitched; GS = Games started; SV = Saves; IP = Innings pitched; R = Runs allowed; ER = Earned runs allowed; BB = Walks allowed; K = Strikeouts  

As of October 4, 2009
† = No longer with team
# = Not on Active roster

Farm system

References

External links

2009 Atlanta Braves season at Baseball Reference
2009 Atlanta Braves season Official Site
Atlanta Braves at ESPN.com
(Archived 2009-06-20)

Atlanta Braves seasons
Atlanta Braves
Atlanta